Lago Piratuba Biological Reserve is a biological reserve in the state of Amapá, Brazil.

Location

It is administered by the Chico Mendes Institute for Biodiversity Conservation.
It covers parts of the municipalities of Pracuúba, Tartarugalzinho and Amapá in the state of Amapá.

Relative humidity is 80%.
The region is flat, formed by sediments of mixed river and ocean origin, and subject to periodic flooding.
There is great diversity of plants, with dense floodplain rainforest transitioning into coastal mangrove.
Fauna is also very diverse, including green sea turtle (Chelonia mydas) and leatherback sea turtle (Dermochelys coriacea), migrating or resident birds such as pelicans and osprey, and mammals such as capybara, otter and racoon in the flooded fields.

The North-eastern point is not included in the reserve, because it contains the village of Sucuriju. The reserve surrounding the village gives it island characteristics.

Conservation

It is part of the Amapá Biodiversity Corridor, created in 2003.
The conservation unit is supported by the Amazon Region Protected Areas Program.
The main objective is to protect the flora and fauna of the Amazon ecosystem in its transition into the lagoon zone.
Protected species are jaguar (Panthera onca), giant otter (Pteronura brasiliensis) and Amazonian manatee (Trichechus inunguis).

References

Sources

1980 establishments in Brazil
Biological reserves of Brazil
Protected areas of Amapá
Protected areas established in 1980